The ruins of St. Anthony Church is located at Rodon Cape (alternatively known as Skanderbeg Cape) in Durrës County, is a Cultural Monument of Albania. It became a Cultural Monument in 1963. It is also the burial place of Andrea II Muzaka  and of his wife.

History
Saint Anthony Church was of the most popular churches of the area of the Albanian Medieval Period. This is also due to the construction of Skanderbeg's Castle in that Cape area in the 15th century, Indirectly it is called the Skanderbeg church. The monument today presents value as a building belonging to the Romano-Gothic architecture of the 13th century. After its reconstruction in the last years one can still clearly see a stradioti on the horse and a double-headed eagle, with arms lowered down. In other parts of the wall there are other fresco footprints. A monastery once stood near the church. Historical documents mention the Monastery of Saint Mary, but also the Monastery of Saint Anthony. Researchers think that the Church of Saint Anthony should be identified with the monastery of Saint Mary. The church appears to have been among the earliest Franciscan congregations since 1599.

Gallery

References

Cultural Monuments of Albania
Buildings and structures in Durrës
Churches in Albania
Tourist attractions in Durrës County
Gothic architecture in Albania